Betsy Ann Hisle (born Juanita J. Hisle; May 30, 1917 – September 20, 1978) was an American child actress. She is best known for appearing in Nellie, the Beautiful Cloak Model (1924), The Way of All Flesh (1927) and Sorrell and Son (1927).

Filmography

References

External links 

Rotten Tomatoes profile

1917 births
1978 deaths
People from Seattle
Actresses from Seattle
American film actresses
American child actresses
20th-century American actresses